Hemileuca is a genus of moths in the family Saturniidae first described by Francis Walker in 1855.

Species
Hemileuca annulata Ferguson, 1971
Hemileuca artemis Packard, 1893
Hemileuca burnsi J.H. Watson, 1910
Hemileuca chinatiensis (Tinkham, 1943)
Hemileuca conwayae Peigler, 1985
Hemileuca dyari (Draudt, 1930)
Hemileuca eglanterina (Boisduval, 1852)
Hemileuca electra Wright, 1884
Hemileuca griffini Tuskes, 1978
Hemileuca grotei Grote & Robinson, 1868
Hemileuca hera (Harris, 1841)
Hemileuca hualapai (Neumoegen, 1882)
Hemileuca juno Packard, 1872
Hemileuca lares (Druce, 1897)
Hemileuca lex (Druce, 1897)
Hemileuca lucina H. Edwards, 1887
Hemileuca magnifica (Rotger, 1948)
Hemileuca maia (Drury, 1773)
Hemileuca mania (Druce, 1897)
Hemileuca marillia Dyar, 1911
Hemileuca mexicana (Druce, 1887)
Hemileuca neumoegeni (H. Edwards, 1881)
Hemileuca nevadensis Stretch, 1872
Hemileuca numa (Druce, 1887)
Hemileuca nuttalli (Strecker, 1875)
Hemileuca oliviae Cockerell, 1898
Hemileuca peigleri Lemaire, 1981
Hemileuca peninsularis Lemaire, 1993
Hemileuca rubridorsa R. Felder & Rogenhofer, 1874
Hemileuca slosseri Peigler & Stone, 1989
Hemileuca sororia (H. Edwards, 1881)
Hemileuca stonei Lemaire, 1993
Hemileuca tricolor (Packard, 1872)

References

Hemileucinae